Ömer Küyük (1900 – 12 January 2006) was one of the last Turkish veterans of the Turkish War of Independence (1919–1923).

Called , he fought in the Independence War as a marksman private.

He lived in the small town of Iskilip in Çorum Province, and died on January 12, 2006,  at the age of 106.

His memories from the War of Independence and his daily life along with those of two other veterans, Veysel Turan and Yakup Satar, are depicted in the documentary film Son Buluşma (2007) by Nesli Çölgeçen.

References 

1900 births
2006 deaths
People from İskilip
Turkish military personnel of the Turkish War of Independence
Members of Kuva-yi Milliye
Turkish centenarians
Men centenarians